Wilhelm Fahlbusch (8 November 1914 – 12 June 2006) was a highly decorated Major im Generalstab in the Luftwaffe during World War II, and a recipient of the Knight's Cross of the Iron Cross.

Awards and decorations
 Iron Cross (1939)
 2nd Class 
 1st Class 
 Anti-Aircraft Flak Battle Badge
 Knight's Cross of the Iron Cross on 31 December 1941 as Oberleutnant and chief of the 8./Flak-Regiment 11 (motorized)

References

Citations

Bibliography

External links
Lexikon der Wehrmacht
TracesOfWar.com

1914 births
2006 deaths
Military personnel from Hanover
People from the Province of Hanover
Luftwaffe personnel of World War II
Bundeswehr generals
Brigadier generals of the German Air Force
Recipients of the Knight's Cross of the Iron Cross